Mount Guna (Amharic: ጉና ተራራ, Guna Terara) is a mountain and shield volcano located near the cities of Nefas Mewcha and Debre Tabor, in the northern Amhara region of Ethiopia.

Mount Guna forms part of the divide between the drainage basins of the Abay and the Tekezé rivers. It is the origin of the Gumara, Rib, and other rivers, which flow into Lake Tana and Yikalo, Mebela, Goleye and other rivers, which flow into the Tekezé river.

See also
 List of Ultras of Africa

References

Guna
Amhara Region
Ethiopian Highlands